George Gunn may refer to:
George Gunn (Canadian politician) (1833–1901?), politician in Manitoba, Canada
George Gunn (cricketer) (1879–1958), English cricketer
George Gunn Jr. (cricketer) (1905–1957), English cricketer, son of the above
George Ward Gunn (1912–1941), British recipient of the Victoria Cross in World War II
George F. Gunn Jr. (1927–1998), U.S. federal judge
George Gunn, New Zealand landowner for whom Lake Gunn is named